Panaqolus maccus, commonly called the clown panaque, clown plecostomus, clown pleco, or ringlet pleco, is a dwarf loricariid. By numbering systems such as the L-number system, this fish may also be known as L104, L162, or LDA22.

Distribution and habitat
This fish is endemic to Venezuela where it is found in the tannic Apuré and Caroní River basins. Their natural environment is driftwood tangles near riverbanks.

Description

This species is a small loricariid. It reaches a length of  SL.

This species has a striped pattern. However, this colouration may change with age. There are specimens with straight bars, but there are also specimens with a broken or wavy pattern. The wavy pattern form is found in the actual Orinoco and its tributaries in Bolivar State, Venezuela, while the "normal" patterned P. maccus comes from further north and west (Cojedes, Portuguesa, Guarico, and Apure States) in the Llanos where the drainages run into the Apure River.

In the aquarium
Panaqolus maccus is one of the most common species of small, striped loricariids available in the fishkeeping hobby. This species adapts well to aquarium life. They are not too difficult to spawn.

It should always be provided with enough driftwood in the tank, as it is a wood-eating fish. However fresh vegetables, spirulina and frozen foods such as bloodworms are recommended to be given as well from time to time. They are very peaceful fish suited for the average community tank. They are a hardy species of catfish and can tolerate various water parameters but prefer softer, more acidic water. Good filtration is needed because of the large amounts of waste they produce, caused by their wood-based diet. It is suited for tanks starting from 15 gallons.

Breeding 
It is difficult to successfully breed these fish in captivity. The tank setting and water parameters must be as near to their native habitat as possible. Seasonal changes can be simulated by adjusting the pH and temperature of the water. Soft driftwoods and cave formations give ample hiding places for the females to feel comfortable, and they may deposit eggs at some point.

References

Ancistrini
Fish of Venezuela
Endemic fauna of Venezuela
Taxa named by Scott Allen Schaefer
Taxa named by Donald J. Stewart
Fish described in 1993